Baby Bonus (simplified Chinese: 添丁发财) is a Singaporean Chinese drama which was telecasted on Singapore's free-to-air channel, MediaCorp Channel 8. It stars Felicia Chin, Tay Ping Hui, Jesseca Liu & Darren Lim as the casts of the series. It made its debut on 30 September 2009 and ended on 30 October 2009. This drama serial consists of 23 episodes, and was screened on every weekday night at 9:00 pm.

Cast

Main

 Felicia Chin as 黄丽萍 Huang Li Ping
 Jesseca Liu as 郑晓阳 Zheng Xiao Yang
 Darren Lim as 郑国安 Zheng Guo An
 Tay Ping Hui as 李佳城 Li Jiacheng, Li is a simple and good-natured person who is in love with Zheng Xiao Yang but is taking care of Huang's child.
 Leroy Chng as Olympic

Supporting

 Apple Hong as Angel
 Terence Cao as Simon Koh 许晴光
 Xiang Yun as 黄美玲 Huang Mei Ling
 Zhu Hou Ren as 郑发材 Zheng Fa Cai
 Lin Meijiao as 龙宝音 Long Bao Yin
 Jerry Yeo as Ah Xiang

Accolades

References 

Singapore Chinese dramas
2009 Singaporean television series debuts
2009 Singaporean television series endings
Channel 8 (Singapore) original programming